You Can't Fix Stupid is an album by American comedian Ron White. It was released by Image Entertainment on February 7, 2006. The album peaked at number 1 on the Billboard Top Comedy Albums chart.

Track listing
"Intro" – 0:52
"Seeing Old Friends" – 0:18
"Landscraper" – 1:40
"Touring on the Bus" – 1:10
"Cheesewheel" – 1:00
"Michael Jackson" – 1:54
"Petticoat Junction" – 1:16
"Ft. Polk" – 1:03
"The Globe" – 0:52
"A Flipper" – 1:32
"Bachelorette Party" – 4:08
"Refill" – 0:46
"You Can't Fix Stupid" – 2:21
"Squirrel Man" – 12:28
"Chocolate" – 1:16
"Highway Delight" – 0:47
"Mile High Club" – 1:07
"Work Ethic" – 0:27
"High School" – 1:14
"Grandma in Texas" – 3:56
"Cousin Ray" – 4:10

Charts

Weekly charts

Year-end charts

References

2006 albums
Ron White albums
Image Entertainment live albums